Libertadores de Querétaro (English: Querétaro Liberators) is a professional Mexican basketball team, based in Querétaro City, Querétaro. The Libertadores are part of the Liga Nacional de Baloncesto Profesional, the top professional basketball league in Mexico. The team plays their home games at the Auditorio General Arteaga, with a capacity of 4,138 spectators.

Libertadores was established in 2009 and joined Liga Nacional de Baloncesto Profesional for the 2009–10 season, but it folded after the end of the season. The team came back for the 2017–18 season.

History
Libertadores de Querétaro was founded in 2009 and they joined the top-level of Mexican basketball, the Liga Nacional de Baloncesto Profesional, for the 2009–10 season. The team decided not to participate for the next season due to financial problems, allegedly, because the State's government decided to end their monetary support to the team.

In 2017, after six years of absence, the team announced their return to professional basketball for the 2017–18 season. Amongst the team's plans for their comeback to the LNBP was a renovation of the Auditorio General Arteaga.

Players

Current roster

Notable players

  Jordan Adams
  Anthony Roberson

References

External links 
 Official website 
 Team profile 

 
Basketball teams established in 2017
2017 establishments in Mexico
Sports teams in Querétaro
Querétaro City